Rebecca Young (née Anderson; born 27 December 1981) is an Australian rugby league and rugby union footballer who played for the Sydney Roosters in the NRL Women's Premiership. 

In rugby union, she represented Australia at the 2006 Women's Rugby World Cup.

Background
Young was born in Newcastle, New South Wales and is of Indigenous Australian descent. She is married to former Newcastle Knights player Michael Young.

Playing career

Rugby union
Young played rugby union for Merewether Carlton from 1999 to 2011 and represented the New South Wales Country team.

In 2006, she represented Australia at the Women's World Cup in Canada. She was named in the Wallaroos 22-player squad that toured New Zealand in October 2007.

Rugby league
In 2011, Young began playing in the Sydney Metropolitan Women's Rugby League and for the Indigenous All Stars in the inaugural women's All Stars match. Later that year, she made her Test debut for Australia against Samoa and represented New South Wales in their 0–26 loss to Queensland.

In 2013, Young was a member of Australia's 2013 Women's Rugby League World Cup-winning squad, alongside her sister-in-laws Emma and Julie Young.

In 2017, Young was a member of Australia's 2017 Women's Rugby League World Cup-winning squad but did not play in the final.

On 6 October 2018, she captained the Prime Minister's XIII in their 40–4 win over Papua New Guinea.

On 1 July 2019, Young joined the Sydney Roosters NRL Women's Premiership squad. In Round 1 of the 2019 NRL Women's season, she made her debut for the Roosters in a 12–16 loss to the New Zealand Warriors.

References

External links
NRL profile

1981 births
Living people
Australia women's international rugby union players
Australian female rugby union players
Indigenous Australian rugby league players
Australia women's national rugby league team players
Rugby league props
Sydney Roosters (NRLW) players